Nervesa della Battaglia is a comune (municipality) in the Province of Treviso in the Italian region Veneto, located about  north of Venice and about  north of Treviso.

In February 1358 Nervesa was the scene of a battle in which the Republic of Venice was defeated by the forces of King Louis I of Hungary. That defeat forced the Venetians to sign the highly unfavorable Treaty of Zadar.

Sites include the remains of the Abbey of Sant'Eustachio, near the Piave river, which reached its apex in the 13th century. It was abandoned in 1865, and heavily damaged during the Battle of the Piave River in World War I. Another disappeared convent is the Charterhouse of San Girolamo, located on the Montello hill.

Economy 
The economy is based on a highly developed industrial sector, which continues to be supported by the agricultural sector. Cereals, wheat, vegetables, fodder, vines and fruit trees are grown and cattle, pigs and poultry are raised. Industrial production is developed in the mining (stone), food, textile, clothing, chemical, metallurgical and construction sectors.

Twin towns
Nervesa della Battaglia is twinned with:

  Lugo, Italy, since 1968

Main sights
The town contains Ai Pioppi, a human-powered playground outside of a restaurant created by the restaurant's owner.

See also
Bavaria (Nervesa della Battaglia)

References

External links
 Official website
 Proloco Nervesa

Cities and towns in Veneto